Herbert Davis Chalke OBE (Mil), TD, FRCP, MRCS, MA (Cantab) (15 June 1897 – 8 October 1979) was a British physician known for his work in the fields of social medicine and medical history. He was the founding editor-in-chief of the medical journal Alcohol and Alcoholism.

Biography
Chalke was educated at Porth County School, the University of Wales, Cambridge University, and St. Bartholomew's Hospital. He later served in the Royal Flying Corps during part of World War I and all of World War II, retiring as a colonel. In the 1930s, the King Edward VII Welsh National Memorial Association appointed him to study tuberculosis mortality in Wales. He played a major role in a campaign to control a typhus epidemic in Naples, Italy during the 1940s, for which he received the Typhus Commission Medal from the United States government.

He is survived by his son David John Chalke, now a leading social analyst in Australia.

References

External links
Wellcome Library page

1897 births
1979 deaths
20th-century British medical doctors
Medical journal editors
Alumni of the University of Wales
Researchers in alcohol abuse
Alumni of the University of Cambridge
British medical historians